Leisureland Fair is a defunct amusement park in Langwarrin, Victoria, Australia which operated from 1984 to 1992. It is now a housing estate with the only reference to it being a street named after it. The amusement park was situated on a large plot of land with a steam train which would take passengers from the carpark to the park itself.

The park consisted of many attractions including a custom built steel roller coaster, log flume, waterslides, mini-golf, a function centre and various other rides. The park was then sold on to a religious group who developed the site into housing.

The only remaining part of Leisureland Fair is the Function Centre, otherwise known as The Castle. The property is now under private ownership and was once the main terminus for the amusement park, situated in the centre of the park.

The Function Centre has now been significantly renovated on the inside and operates as a Mosque and cultural centre, the Bait-ul-Salam - House of Peace Mosque, for the Australian Ahmadiyyan Muslim Community.

See also
List of defunct amusement parks

References

1984 establishments in Australia
1992 disestablishments in Australia
Defunct amusement parks in Australia
Fairs in Australia
Amusement parks in Victoria (Australia)